Palaeoglomus ("ancient ball") is a genus of microscopic mycorrhizal fossil, found in palynological preparations of rocks which separate out organic remains by acid dissolution.

Description
Palaeoglomus has large spherical to ellipsoidal spores with multilayered walls, as well as irregularly shaped vesicles, attached to aseptate hyphae.

Species
Palaeoglomus grayi type species from the Middle Ordovician Guttenberg Formation near Platteville, Wisconsin. 

Palaeoglomus boullardi from the Early Devonian Rhynie Chert bear Rhynie, Scotland. 

Palaeoglomus strotheri from the Middle Ordovician (Darriwilian, 460 million years old) Douglas Lake Member of the Lenoir Limestone from Douglas Dam,  Tennessee.

Biological affinities
Palaeoglomus is similar to modern mycorrhizae such as Glomus.

References

Fossils of Tennessee
Paleozoic fungi
Glomerales